Spofforth can refer to:

Places 
 Spofforth, North Yorkshire, England

People 
David Spofforth (born 1969), English professional footballer
Gemma Spofforth (born 1987) British Olympic Swimmer
Fred Spofforth (1853–1926) Australian cricketer
Reginald Spofforth (1769–1826), English composer